Ricsige (also rendered Ricsy, Ricsi or Ricsig) was King of Northumbria from 873 to 876. He became king after Ecgberht I was overthrown and fled, with Wulfhere, Archbishop of York, to Mercia.

Career
In 872, Northumbria rebelled against the Great Heathen Army and their collaborators. The Northumbrians expelled Ecgberht I of Northumbria and Wulfhere of York. After the death of Ecgberht in 873, Ricsige became King of Northumbria, and restored Wulfhere as Archbishop of York.

The Anglo-Saxon Chronicle reports that the Great Heathen Army came north against the Northumbrians in 873. Halfdan Ragnarsson departed Repton in 875, bringing Northumbria under his dominion and destroying all of the monasteries. Halfdan would divide the land the following year amongst his followers, with Ricsige reportedly dying that same year from a broken heart according to the Flores Historiarum.

Popular culture
In 2020, Ricsige was featured in Ubisoft's Assassin's Creed: Valhalla, installed as the King of Northumbria by Halfdan Ragnarsson after Ecgberht's deposition.

References

Bibliography

External links
 
 King Ricsige of Northumbria at AH Gray

Northumbrian monarchs
9th-century English monarchs